Čenkovská forest-steppe or Čenkovská steppe is a nature reserve in the Slovak county of Nové Zámky in the municipality of Mužla. It covers an area of 79.6 ha and has a protection level of 4 under the slovak law which corresponds with the IUCN level III.

Description
The Čenkovská forest-steppe area was declared a protected area in 1965 and was last re-designated in 1988. It is the only national nature reserve in Slovakia to protect the Pannonian steppe ecosystem. This includes the protection of xerophile communities of sandy habitats of the Danubian Lowland, protected and endangered plants in the area include species such as Cotinus coggygria, Iris pontica, Ephedra distachya, Gypsophila fastigiata subsp. arenaria and several protected animals.

References

Geography of Nitra Region
Protected areas of Slovakia